The 1975 Virginia Slims of Chicago  was a women's tennis tournament played on indoor carpet courts at the Chicago Amphitheatre  in Chicago, Illinois in the United States that was part of the 1975 Virginia Slims World Championship Series. The tournament was held from February 10 through February 15, 1975. Third-seeded Margaret Court won the singles title and earned $15,000 first-prize money.

Finals

Singles
 Margaret Court defeated  Martina Navratilova 6–3, 3–6, 6–2

Doubles
 Chris Evert /  Martina Navratilova defeated  Margaret Court /  Olga Morozova 6–2, 7–5

Prize money

References

External links
 Women's Tennis Association (WTA) tournament details

Virginia Slims of Chicago
1975 in Illinois
Carpet court tennis tournaments
February 1975 sports events in the United States